Elena Ramona Andrieș (born ) is a Romanian weightlifter, and two time European Champion competing in the 48 kg category until 2018 and 49 kg starting in 2018 after the International Weightlifting Federation reorganized the categories. representing Romania at international competitions.

Career

World Championships
She has competed at three world championships, the first being the 2010 World Weightlifting Championships where she competed as a 16 year old.

European Championships
She also competed at the 2017 European Weightlifting Championships, where she won a bronze medal in the snatch and total. The following year she competed at the 2018 European Weightlifting Championships in the 48 kg category which was held in her home country of Romania. She won gold medals in all three lifts finishing with a total of 179 kg.

In 2019 she competed at the 2019 European Weightlifting Championships, which was the first European Weightlifting Championships after the IWF restructured the weight classes. In the 49 kg category she again swept all three gold medals in the snatch, clean & jerk and total. Her total of 190 kg was a full 29 kg ahead of the silver medalist.

Doping Ban
In 2013 she tested positive for Stanazolol at the 2013 European Weightlifting Championships and had her performance and medals disqualified. She was banned from competing from 8 April 2013 to 8 April 2015.

Major results

References

External links
 
 

1994 births
Living people
Romanian female weightlifters
Place of birth missing (living people)
European Weightlifting Championships medalists
World Weightlifting Championships medalists
21st-century Romanian women